Brideun School for Exceptional Children was a school for twice exceptional (2e) children in Lafayette, Colorado.  It operated between 2000 and 2006 and received some national attention.  It was the first elementary school in United States specifically founded for 2e students.

References

External links
 (archived version)

Schools in Boulder County, Colorado
Defunct schools in Colorado
Educational institutions established in 2000
Educational institutions disestablished in 2006
Lafayette, Colorado
2000 establishments in Colorado
2006 disestablishments in Colorado